Justin Watson (born January 7, 1975 in the Bronx, New York) is a former professional American football player who played three seasons as a running back for the St. Louis Rams.  Watson was recorded on camera during Super Bowl XXXVI saying, "I told you, I like our chances! We are the number one offense in the league. I like our chances,” immediately following a St. Louis Rams game tying touchdown and moments before Tom Brady led the New England Patriots on a game winning drive.

References

1975 births
American football running backs
San Diego State Aztecs football players
St. Louis Rams players
Living people
Berlin Thunder players